Doodle God is a puzzle video game developed by JoyBits and originally released for iOS and Adobe Flash. It released around the same time as another similar browser game Little Alchemy, both of which share gameplay inspired by a DOS game Alchemy from 1997.

Gameplay
Acting as the Doodle God, the player must combine available elements together to gain access to new elements. Combinations can be both physical (such as combining Water and Lava to obtain Steam and Stone) and metaphorical (such as combining Water and Fire to obtain Alcohol). The game begins with only the four classical elements (fire, water, air and earth), and centers on the discovery of 115 elements across 14 categories. Should the player be stuck, a hint is available every few minutes.

Reception

Doodle God received the Weekly Users' Choice award on a web game portal Newgrounds. The game became a commercial success and has made it JoyBits' flagship series of games, having sequels and spin-offs such as Doodle Devil, Doodle Kingdom, Doodle Creatures, Doodle Tanks and Doodle Farm.

References

External links
 Doodle God official website

Android (operating system) games
Bada games
BlackBerry games
Flash games
IOS games
Java platform games
PlayStation 4 games
PlayStation Vita games
PlayStation Network games
Symbian games
Windows games
Windows Phone games
Mobile games
2010 video games
God games
Video games developed in Russia
J2ME games